Tolonus is a genus of ichneumon wasps in the subfamily Cryptinae.

References 

Ichneumonidae genera
Cryptinae